Shusef Rural District is a rural district (dehestan) in Shusef District, Nehbandan County, South Khorasan Province, Iran. At the 2006 census, its population was 6,107, in 1,578 families.  The rural district has 85 villages.

References 

Rural Districts of South Khorasan Province
Nehbandan County